The 1990 Nippon Professional Baseball season was the 41st season of operation for the league.

Regular season standings

Central League

Pacific League

Japan Series

See also
1990 Major League Baseball season

References

 
1990 in baseball
1990 in Japanese sport